The Al-Falah Mosque, built in 1987, is a mosque in Singapore.

Transportation
The mosque is accessible from Somerset MRT station.

See also
 Islam in Singapore
 List of mosques in Singapore

References

External links 
Al-Falah Mosque
Majlis Ugama Islam Singapura, MUIS (Islamic Religious Council of Singapore)
List of Mosques in Singapore managed by MUIS : Masjid Al-Falah

1987 establishments in Singapore
Falah
Mosques completed in 1987
Orchard Road
20th-century architecture in Singapore